Mark Steven Alexander (born 5 April 1962) is an English first-class cricketer.  Alexander is a left-handed batsman who bowls right-arm off break and who formerly played primarily as a wicketkeeper.  He was born at Farnborough, Kent.

Alexander represented the Kent Cricket Board in List A cricket.  His debut List A game came against Denmark in the 1999 NatWest Trophy.  From 1999 to 2001, he represented the Board in 9 List A matches, the last of which came against the Leicestershire Cricket Board in the 2nd round of the 2002 Cheltenham & Gloucester Trophy which was held in 2001.  In his 9 List A matches, he scored 182 runs at a batting average of 26.00, with a single century high score of 107*.  Behind the stumps he took 4 catches and made a single stumping.

He currently plays club cricket for Tunbridge Wells Cricket Club in the Kent Cricket League.

References

External links
Mark Alexander at Cricinfo
Mark Alexander at CricketArchive

1962 births
Living people
People from Farnborough, London
English cricketers
Kent Cricket Board cricketers
Wicket-keepers